Linghems SK is a Swedish football club located in Linghem.

Background
Linghems SK currently plays in Division 3 Östergötland Östra which is the sixth tier of Swedish football. They play their home matches at the Lingheden in Linghem.

The club is affiliated to Östergötlands Fotbollförbund.

Season to season

Footnotes

External links
 Linghems SK – Official website
 Linghems SK on Facebook

Football clubs in Östergötland County